Busabout Sydney is a bus company that operates route bus services in South West Sydney, Australia. It currently operates on behalf of Transport for NSW.

History

In November 1947, Sid Neville purchased route 58 Liverpool - Leppington - Rossmore - Bringelly from MB & AK Scott. In April 1955, Neville purchased route 94 Liverpool - Ingleburn from Liverpool-Ingleburn Bus Service. In the 1960s, a coach charter business was established under the Coachways brand.

In 1994 Joe and Tony Calabro bought a 50% share of Neville's Bus Service with the operation rebranded as Busabout.

The Calabro family had a long history with the south-western suburbs, having operated services in Bonnyrigg from 1951 until selling the operation to Westbus in June 1989 with 70 buses and coaches. Joe and Tony Calabro subsequently purchased Surfside Buslines in October 1989 followed by Hawkesbury Valley in November 1990.

In September 1997, the Calabros purchased Liverpool Transport Co from the Garrard family, who operated services from Liverpool to Miller, Austral, Hillview and Cartwright. In October 2001 the Calabros purchased the remaining shares in Busabout and it was amalgamated with Liverpool Transport Co at the latter's West Hoxton depot under the Busabout name.

On 2 December 2008, the Calabros purchased the Fearne's Coaches business in Wagga Wagga and Harden and rebranded it as Busabout Wagga Wagga

From 2005 to 2013 Busabout's services were part of Sydney Bus Region 2, with some routes part of Region 3. On 13 October 2013, Transit Systems Sydney took over Region 3 having won a tender to operate the new region including two routes that were operated by Busabout.

On 1 June 2014, Busabout's Sydney Bus Region 2 services passed to Interline and Busabout took over the Sydney Bus Region 15 services from Busways. A new depot in region 15 opened 20 January 2015.

Fleet
As at December 2020, the fleet consists of 124 buses. Since 2001 all purchases have been bodied at the Calabro's Bustech operation. With the introduction of the Busabout name in 1994, a white, green and yellow livery was introduced. In 2010 the Transport for NSW white and blue livery began to be applied.

References

External links

Showbus gallery

Bus companies of New South Wales
Bus transport in Sydney
Transport companies established in 1947
Australian companies established in 1947